Swindon  is a civil parish in the district of South Staffordshire, Staffordshire, England.  It contains three listed buildings that are recorded in the National Heritage List for England.  All the listed buildings are designated at Grade II, the lowest of the three grades, which is applied to "buildings of national importance and special interest".  The parish contains the village of Swindon and the surrounding area.  All the listed buildings are in the village, and consist of a public house and an adjoining barn, and a range of farm buildings.


Buildings

References

Citations

Sources

Lists of listed buildings in Staffordshire